Rio Vista is a city in Johnson County, Texas, United States. The population was 1,008 in 2020.

Geography

Rio Vista is located in southern Johnson County at  (32.237783, –97.377151). Texas State Highway 174 passes through the west side of the city, leading north  to Cleburne, the county seat, and southwest  to Meridian.

The city's area drains to the Nolan River, a tributary of the Brazos River.

Demographics

As of the 2020 United States census, there were 1,008 people, 418 households, and 331 families residing in the city.

Education
The city is served by the Rio Vista Independent School District.

References

External links
City of Rio Vista official website

Cities in Johnson County, Texas
Cities in Texas
Dallas–Fort Worth metroplex